Nemom State assembly constituency is one of the 140 state legislative assembly constituencies in Kerala. It is also one of the 7 state legislative assembly constituencies included in the Thiruvananthapuram Lok Sabha constituency. As of the 2021 assembly elections, the current MLA is V. Sivankutty of CPI(M).

Local self governed segments
Nemom Niyamasabha constituency is composed of the following local self governed segments after the Redetermination of the Constituency in 2011:

Wards in Nemom LAC 

 Thirumala
 Poojappura
 Karamana
 Mudavanmugal
 Thrikkannapuram
 Nemom
 Ponnumangalam
 Punnaykkamugal
 Pappanamcode
 Estate
 Nedumkadu
 Kaladi
 Melamcode
 Punchakkari
 Poonkulam
 Vellar
 Thiruvallom
 Ambalathara
 Kamaleswaram
 Kalippankulam
 Attukal
 Muttathara (4 booths)
 Puthenpalli (2 booths)
 Kuryathi (2 booths)
 Arannoor (1 booth)
 Chalai (1 booth)

Members of Legislative Assembly
The following list contains all members of Kerala legislative assembly who have represented Nemom Niyamasabha Constituency during the period of various assemblies:

Key

Election results
Percentage change (±%) denotes the change in the number of votes from the immediate previous election.

Niyamasabha Election 2021
There were 2,04,240 registered voters in Nemom Constituency for the 2021 Kerala Niyamasabha Election.

Niyamasabha Election 2016
There were 1,92,459 registered voters in Nemom Constituency for the 2016 Kerala Niyamasabha Election.

Niyamasabha election 2011 
First election after the Redetermination of Nemom Constituency. Different from the previous Nemom Constituency. Presently, it includes the parts of Previous Thiruvananthapuram East & Nemom Constitutencies.There were 1,72,493 registered voters in the constituency for the 2011 election.

Niyamasabha election 2006 
There were 1,79,417 registered voters in the constituency for the 2006 election.

See also 
 Nemom
 Thiruvananthapuram district
 List of constituencies of the Kerala Legislative Assembly
 2016 Kerala Legislative Assembly election

References

Assembly constituencies of Kerala

State assembly constituencies in Thiruvananthapuram district